Santo Buda (born c. 1945) is a former American football coach. He served as the head football coach at the University of Nebraska Omaha  from 1978 to 1989, compiling a record of 84–49, and the Omaha Mammoths of the Fall Experimental Football League during that team's lone season in 2014.  Buda attended Creighton Preparatory School in Omaha, Nebraska.  He played college football and college baseball at the University of Kansas, before graduating in 1967.

Head coaching record

References

Year of birth missing (living people)
1940s births
Living people
American football ends
American football quarterbacks
Baseball first basemen
Kansas Jayhawks baseball players
Kansas Jayhawks football coaches
Kansas Jayhawks football players
Kansas State Wildcats football coaches
Nebraska–Omaha Mavericks football coaches
Sportspeople from Omaha, Nebraska
Players of American football from Nebraska
Baseball players from Nebraska